Dagny Tande Lid (25 May 1903 – 28 January 1998) was a Norwegian painter, illustrator and poet. She is most noted for her drawings of plants and is known for her own illustrated poetry collections and for her botanical illustrations of Norwegian postage stamps.

Background
Dagny Tande  was born May 25, 1903 in Nissedal parish in Telemark, Norway. Her parents were Johan Didrik Tande (1869–1938) and Thea Gertine Mortensen (1863–1951). She attended the Norwegian National Academy of Craft and Art Industry under Eivind Nielsen (1928–29), and evening school with Olaf Willums (1929–33), and at the Art Academy under Halfdan Strøm  and Axel Revold  (1929–30). From 1931-1933, she also took up the study of tapestry at the   National Women's Industrial School  (Statens kvinnelige industriskole i Oslo).

Career
Her work as an illustrator of scientific and popular works of botany has won great acclaim. Lid is best known for her illustrations for the Norwegian Mountain Flora (Fjellflora), which has been issued in 325 000 copies since the first printing in 1952. The text was written by Norwegian botanist and politician, Olav Gjærevoll. The book has been translated into several languages, including English, German, Swedish and Finnish.

She is also represented in several of the popular papers and books by Danish-Canadian botanist Erling Porsild, including Edible plants of the Arctic (1953), Illustrated Flora of the Canadian Arctic Archipelago (1957), and   Rocky Mountain wild flowers (1974). She also illustrated Føroya Flora (1936) by Rasmus Rasmussen, Svalbards flora (1979) by  Olaf I. Rønning,  Flora of Alaska and Neighboring Territories (1968) by Eric Hultén  and some Icelandic floras by Áskell Löve.

In 1936, she married Norwegian conservationist, botanist, ethnologist and author Johannes Lid (1886–1971). She worked for many years as illustrator for her husband, who for many years wrote floras for Norway, Sweden and Finland.

From 1959 until the early 1980s she made the illustrations for ten Norwegian stamps with flowers. They rank among Norway's most popular stamps issued. Her Mountain Flora illustrations were also printed on china cups and plates.

Her style is marked by a great sense of detail, combined with clarity which some critics claim has made her illustrations like comic book illustrations. Some will see similarities between her work with flowers and the Belgian artist, Hergé, in the ligne claire style and the interest in accuracy and detail. However, her personal style has been a source of inspiration for many amateur botanists, and her work has contributed to the growth in interest in botany, particularly in Norway's mountain regions.

Written works
As an author of poems and prose pieces, Dagny Tande Lid told of her childhood in an itinerant minister's family, about people and events that have meant a lot to her, and about joy and happiness in work and marriage. She wrote several collections of poems, illustrated by herself, in her later years. In 1987 her autobiography, Mitt liv  was issued and in 1974 Lykken mellom to mennesker, a biographical tribute to her marriage to Johannes Lid.
 Syng blomstring: Tegninger og dikt   (1975)
 Vindens lek  (1977)
 Høstens blader: Tegninger og dikt  (1978)
 Vart underlige liv: Illustrert med noen av jordens sjeldneste vekster  (1979)
 Brikker i et spill  (1981)
 Guds fotspor  (1982)
 Langs stien   (1983)
 Dagboksblader: Fra et pensjonisthjem  (1984)
 Forventning: Nye dagboksblader (1985)

References

Related reading
 Hulten, Eric  (1968) Flora of Alaska and Neighboring Territories: A Manual of the Vascular Plants  (Stanford University Press)
 Porsild, Erling (1964) Illustrated Flora of the Canadian Arctic Archipelago (National Museum of Canada)
 Rønning, Olaf (1996) The Flora of Svalbard  (Norsk polarinstitutt)

External links
 Dagny Tande Lid - botanical drawings

1903 births
1998 deaths
People from Nissedal
20th-century Norwegian painters
Norwegian women poets
Norwegian illustrators
Scientific illustrators
20th-century Norwegian poets
Women autobiographers
20th-century Norwegian women writers
Norwegian women painters
20th-century Norwegian women artists
Norwegian autobiographers